Mhic Mac Comhaltan Ua Cleirigh (died 1025) was King of Ui Fiachrach Aidhne.

An unnamed grandson of Comhaltan Ua Cleirigh was the last Ua Cleirigh ruler of Aidhne. Henceforth, the family was dispersed entirely form Aidhne into north Connacht; one Gilla Isa Ó Cléirigh would be Bishop of Leyny (Achonry) before his death in 1230. Descendants would eventually become the Ó Cléirigh Bardic family of Tír Chonaill.

References

External links
 Clare Genealogy: Hynes, Hines, O'Heyne, Ó h-Eidhin
 Irish Kings and High-Kings, Francis John Byrne (2001), Dublin: Four Courts Press, 
 CELT: Corpus of Electronic Texts at University College Cork

People from County Galway
11th-century Irish monarchs
1025 deaths